The 2020–21 season was Shirak's 30th consecutive season in the Armenian Premier League.

Season events
On 27 July, Shirak announced the signings of Gevorg Kasparov, Hovhannes Nazaryan and Vardan Bakalyan.

On 31 July, Shirak announced that Junior Avo Leibe and Artyom Gevorkyan had signed new one-year contracts with the club.

On 18 August, the FFA postponed the match between Shirak and Ararat Yerevan due to the COVID-19 outbreak within the Ararat squad.

On 25 August, Shirak announced that Vsevolod Yermakov, Marko Prljević, Uroš Nenadović, Solomon Udo, Hrayr Mkoyan, Zhirayr Margaryan, Karen Muradyan, Edgar Malakyan and David Manoyan had all joined Shirak on a short-term contracts to aid Shirak in their UEFA Europa League qualifying game on 27 August.

On 9 September, the Football Federation of Armenia announced that Shirak's game at home to Van, scheduled for 11 September, had been postponed.

On 29 September, the season was suspended indefinitely due to the escalating 2020 Nagorno-Karabakh conflict. On 13 October, the FFA announced that the season would resume on 17 October.

On 23 December, Emil Yeghiazaryan, Vardan Bakalyan and Gevorg Kasparov all left Shirak.

On 16 January, Shirak announced the signing of Spasoje Stefanović on a free transfer after he'd left Ararat Yerevan.

On 4 February, Shirak announced the return of Igor Stanojević on a free transfer after he too had left Ararat Yerevan.

On 9 April, Shirak match against Alashkert was postponed as Alashkert were unable to travel to Gyumri due to protests. The following day, the match was rearranged for 11 April.

Squad

Transfers

In

Loans in

Out

Loans out

Released

Trial

Friendlies

Competitions

Premier League

Results summary

Results by round

Results

Table

Armenian Cup

UEFA Europa League

Qualifying rounds

Statistics

Appearances and goals

|-
|colspan="16"|Players away on loan:
|-
|colspan="16"|Players who left Shirak during the season:

|}

Goal scorers

Clean sheets

Disciplinary Record

References

Shirak SC seasons
Shirak